Sentieri Selvaggi is an Italian musical ensemble, specialising in contemporary music. Its name means "Wild Trails" in English.

It was founded in 1997 by Carlo Boccadoro, Filippo Del Corno and Angelo Miotto. The ensemble has worked with composers such as Ludovico Einaudi, Michael Nyman, Philip Glass, Fabio Vacchi, David Lang, James MacMillan, Lorenzo Ferrero, Ivan Fedele and Louis Andriessen.

Sentieri Selvaggi has been a regular guest at Italian musical festivals including Teatro Alla Scala, Venice Biennale and MITO Music September, as well as at Italian cultural events including the Literary Festival at Mantua, the Science Festival at Genoa, and at international festivals including the Bang On A Can Marathon in New York City and the SKIF Festival in Saint Petersburg.

The group also organized a festival in Milan which, since 2005, has become a contemporary music season with a program of concerts, public talks, and master classes. Every program focuses on a specific theme: in 2010 the title of the season was Nuovo Mondo (New World).

The ensemble has also staged chamber operas, including Io Hitler by Filippo Del Corno, The Man Who Mistook His Wife for a Hat by Michael Nyman and The Sound of a Voice by Philip Glass.

Publications and recordings

CDs
La formula del fiore
Bad blood
Child
Acts of beauty
Hotel occidental 
Musica Cœlestis (books/cd) 
Zingiber

In 2006 the ensemble recorded the anthology AC/DC for the American label Cantaloupe Music. In 2008 the recording of Il cantante al microfono with soloist Eugenio Finardi won the 2008 Targa Tenco award.

Repertoire
 John Adams: Gnarly Buttons, Hallelujah Junction
 Louis Andriessen: Passeggiata in tram in America e ritorno (new version), Hout, Zilver, De Staat
 Christina Athinodorou: Aktaí (2008)
 Luciano Berio: O King
 Carlo Boccadoro: Bad blood, Bibì&Bibò, Keep Cool, Zingiber
 Gavin Bryars: Non la conobbe il mondo mentre l’ebbe, Jesus' Blood Never Failed Me Yet 
 Michael Daugherty: Diamond in the rough, Sinatra shag
 Filippo Del Corno: Dogma#6, Hotel Occidental, L’uomo armato, Mancanza di soldi
 Ivan Fedele: Maja, Immagini da Escher
 Lorenzo Ferrero: Glamorama Spies, Tourists and Oracles
 Carlo Galante: La formula del fiore, Urban Ring
 Philip Glass; Facades, The Sound of a Voice, Wichita Vortex Sutra
 Michael Gordon: AC/DC, Industry
 Giya Kancheli: Exil, Nach dem Weinen
 David Lang: Developer, I fought the law, Stick figure, Sweet air    
 James MacMillan: Raising sparks, Parthenogenesis, The Prophecy
 Michael Nyman: Acts of beauty, Something Connected With Energy, The Man Who Mistook His Wife For A Hat
 Arvo Pärt: Miserere, Stabat Mater
 Steve Reich: Cello Counterpoint, Daniel Variations, Proverb
 Fabio Vacchi: Dai calanchi di Sabbiuno, Mi chiamo Roberta

References

External links
 Official website

Italian classical music groups
Musical groups from Milan